The 1920 Centre Praying Colonels football team represented Centre College in the 1920 college football season. The Praying Colonels scored 546 points while allowing 62 points and capped off their season by defeating TCU, 63–7 in the Fort Worth Classic.

Schedule

Season

A prequel to the 1921 Centre vs. Harvard football game followed; Harvard had not lost a game since 1918 and defeated visiting Centre 31–14, finishing with a record of 8–0–1. With the Harvard game tied 7–7, it was 4th down and 6 at the 30-yard line. Instead of punting, McMillin "defied every "don't" in the football book" and tossed a touchdown pass.

A loss at Georgia Tech followed, 24–0; Georgia Tech finished its season 8–1, having outscored its opponents 312–16. One writer recalled he heard a story that Tech tackle Bill Fincher sought to knock Bo McMillin out of the game, taking with him brass-knuckles or "something equally diabolical."

Postseason
Centre then traveled to Fort Worth, Texas for a bowl game, the Fort Worth Classic, against undefeated TCU.  TCU entered the game with a record of 9–0, including wins at Arkansas (19–2) and at Baylor (21–9).  Texas Christian had attained its perfect record while outscoring its opponents 163-46.  Centre won the game handily.  Accounts of the final score vary; some sources say Centre won 63-7 and other sources give the final score as 77–7.

Centre finished the season with a record of 8–2.  McMillan was named to the 1920 College Football All-America Team.

References

Centre
Centre Colonels football seasons
 Centre Praying Colonels football